SWFL Adrenaline was an American soccer club that competed in the Premier Development League, the fourth division of American soccer. The team represented the Naples–Marco Island metro area of Florida.

History
The Adrenaline won their inaugural match 5–1 against Floridians FC on May 11, 2013. Xavier Silva, who also plays for the nearby Florida Gulf Coast University soccer team, scored the team's first-ever goal.

On May 21, 2013, head coach Mick Whitewood was forced to step down and was quickly replaced by John Robinson.  The Adrenaline finished in seventh place of the Southeast division in its inaugural season.

In Jan 2015, Chris Cousins was hired as General Manager to the team, in a dual position that also meant he overlooked the college recruitment of the academy players. Cousins was the founder of the world's leading U.S. College Soccer Recruitment Service, Sports Recruiting USA, who were official partners with the club.

Seasons

References

External links

Association football clubs established in 2012
USL League Two teams
Soccer clubs in Florida
2012 establishments in Florida
2017 disestablishments in Florida
Association football clubs disestablished in 2017